Greatest Hits is the first greatest hits album by singer/songwriter Barry Manilow, released in 1978. The album was certified 3× Platinum in the US, and would be Manilow's last of that certification, . It also features the new single, "Ready to Take a Chance Again", which reached #11 in the US the same year. The US CD version has been released in three slightly different incarnations. The first pressing featured the single version of "Copacabana" (3:58), and the non-hit studio version of "Daybreak" (3:09). "Jump Shout Boogie" was omitted from all three versions.

In some European countries the album was released as Manilow Magic: The Best of Barry Manilow The Very Best of Barry Manilow, or simply The Best Of Barry Manilow. It was a single LP with either 11 or 12 tracks.

Track listing

Side one
"Mandy" (single version) - 3:15
"New York City Rhythm" - 4:42
"Ready to Take a Chance Again" (in mono) (From the Foul Play soundtrack) - 3:01
"Looks Like We Made It" - 3:33
"Daybreak" (Live) - 3:36

Side two
"Can't Smile Without You" - 3:13
"It's a Miracle" (extended single mix) - 3:42
"Even Now" - 3:28
"Bandstand Boogie" - 2:49
"Tryin' to Get the Feeling Again" - 3:51

Side three
"Could It Be Magic" (album version) - 6:50
"Somewhere in the Night" - 3:26
"Jump Shout Boogie" - 3:03
"Weekend in New England" - 3:43
"All the Time" - 3:15

Side four
"This One's for You" - 3:25
"Copacabana (At the Copa) (Disco)" - 5:46
"Beautiful Music" - 4:32
"I Write the Songs" - 3:51

Charts

Album

Singles

Certifications

References

1978 greatest hits albums
Barry Manilow compilation albums
Arista Records compilation albums
Albums produced by Ron Dante